Nummela is the debut album by the Finnish singer Anssi Kela. Released in March 2001, Nummela is the best-charting album in Finland with 16 weeks atop and currently ranks 13th on the list of best-selling albums of all-time in Finland.

Charts and certifications

Weekly charts

Year-end charts

|-

|-

|-

|-

|-

Certifications

See also
List of best-selling albums in Finland

References

2001 debut albums
Anssi Kela albums
Finnish-language albums